The Lion Guard is an American animated television series developed by Ford Riley based on Disney's 1994 film The Lion King. The series was first broadcast with a television movie, titled The Lion Guard: Return of the Roar on Disney Channel on November 22, 2015 and began airing as a TV series on January 15, 2016 on Disney Junior and Disney Channel. The Lion Guard is a sequel to The Lion King and takes place during the time-gap within the 1998 film The Lion King II: Simba's Pride, with the third season taking place in parallel with the film's second act, followed by the final two episodes of Season 3 serving as a continuation to that film. 

The second season premiered on July 7, 2017. A third  season was commissioned on March 15, 2017 and premiered on August 3, 2019. The series finale aired on November 3, 2019.

Series overview

Episodes

Pilot (2015)

Season 1 (2016–17)

Season 2 (2017–19)

Season 3 (2019)
The first eight episodes of season 3 were released on the DisneyNow app on August 3, 2019, while the last eleven episodes were released on the DisneyNow app on September 2, 2019.

Shorts
A short-form series called It's UnBungalievable starring Bunga and Ono was produced by Disneynature and premiered on Disney Junior on January 9, 2016. In the series, Bunga and Ono pick two animals to compete in contests such as "Who's Quicker?" "Who Has Better Hair?" and "Who's Hungrier?" The series features live-action animal footage provided by Disneynature.

References

External links

Episodes
Lists of American children's animated television series episodes